Thomas Taylor Meadows (1815–1868) was a British sinologist. Born in Northern England, after studies in Chinese with Karl Friedrich Neumann at the University of Munich, he became a member of the British diplomatic corps, arriving in Hong Kong in 1842, and becoming Acting Consul in Shanghai 1859-63. His best-known work are "Desultory Notes on the Government and People of China and on the Chinese Language" and "The Chinese and their Rebellions." The latter is valued as a close account of the Taiping Rebellion. He died in north China. Historian John S. Gregory considered him both "deeply concerned for China, and a profound student of its history and culture" as well as "an agent of Western imperialism in China." His younger brother was John Armstrong Taylor Meadows.

References

1815 births
1868 deaths
British sinologists